Harald Marzolf (born 19 January 1980) is a French male canoeist who won the world championships in C1 at individual senior level at the Wildwater Canoeing World Championships.

He is the brother of the other canoeist Helgard Marzolf.

References

External links
 Harald Marzolf at Fédération Française de Canoë-Kayak (FFCK)

1980 births
Living people
French male canoeists
Place of birth missing (living people)